Shanti Kumar Dhariwal is an Indian politician and current Cabinet minister in Ashok Gehlot ministry and also member of 11th, 13th and 15th Legislative Assembly of Rajasthan. He also served as Member of Parliament of Kota (1984–89). And currently he represents Kota North (Assembly constituency) as a member of Indian National Congress.

Early life and education
Dhariwal was born 29 October 1943 in the Kota district of Rajasthan to his father Rikhavchand Dhariwal. He married Komal Dhariwal. He completed his Bachelor of Arts in 1964 and Bachelor of Laws (LLB) in 1966 at the University of Rajasthan.

Political career
Dhariwal was MLA for three strength term from Kota North and Member of Parliament for one term from Kota Lok Sabha as a member of Indian National Congress.

In 15th Legislative Assembly of Rajasthan (2018) elections, he defeated his nearest rival candidate Prahlad Gunjal (BJP) by a margin of 17,945 votes.

In December 2018, he was appointed Cabinet Minister in third Ashok Gehlot ministry with portfolios of Urban Development & Housing Department, Law & Legal Affairs and Legal Consultancy Office, Parliamentary Affairs Department.

Posts held

References

1943 births
Living people
People from Kota district
Rajasthan MLAs 2018–2023
Indian National Congress politicians from Rajasthan